Victor Wallace Germains (born June 1888 in the Fulham district of London) was an English writer. He wrote several books on the military and foreign policy, including on Kitchener and Churchill.

In 1954, Germains wrote Crusoe Warburton, a lost world novel.

During World War I, Germains served as a spy in Austria.

Writings
As a military writer, Germains was classed by Michael Howard with Bernard Acworth and Lionel Charlton as a lesser figure typical of his time.

Books
The Struggle for Bread, 1913 (a reply under the pseudonym "Rifleman" to Norman Angell's The Great Illusion (1910).
The Gathering Storm, 1913 (under the pseudonym "Rifleman"
Austria of Today: with a special chapter on the Austrian police, 1923 (later editions up to 1932)
The Truth about Kitchener, 1925
The "Mechanization" of War, 1927; a contribution to the "tank debate", arguing that anti-tank weapons had greater potential for development, foreword by Frederick Barton Maurice. The work was critical of the approach of J. F. C. Fuller, presaging later British doctrine, and was serialized abroad.
The Kitchener Armies: the story of a national achievement, 1930
The Tragedy of Winston Churchill, 1931
Colonel to Princess. A novel., 1936. A dying princess gets a brain transplant from a colonel. He enjoys being a woman.
Crusoe Warburton, 1954

Articles
"(Warfare of Tomorrow part II) The Cult of the Defensive" pp. 498–502, The Living Age, February 1938
"Not to Overlook the Infantry", pp. 233–237, The Living Age, November 1940

References

External links
WorldCat page

1888 births
British military historians
Year of death missing